Taraxacum erythrospermum, known by the common name red-seeded dandelion, is a species of dandelion introduced to much of North America, but most commonly in the north. It is often considered as a variety of Taraxacum laevigatum (i.e., Taraxacum laevigatum var. erythrospermum). In many characteristics, it is similar to the common dandelion, Taraxacum officinale.

Description
This species is very similar to, and often mistaken for, the common dandelion, Taraxacum officinale. It most readily differs by its reddish-brown seed bases, unlike the more olive colored seeds of T. officinale. The red-seeded dandelion can also be identified by its leaves, which have consistently triangular lobes throughout, whereas T. officinale tends to have erratic lobing with minimal or no triangular form. The leaves of T. erythrospermum thus bear a closer resemblance to the basal leaves of sow thistles (Sonchus oleraceus).

References

erythrospermum
Flora of North America